Universidad Católica de Oriente (UCO) is a Catholic university in Rionegro, Antioquia, Colombia.

External links
 Universidad Católica de Oriente 

Catholic universities and colleges in Colombia